Double Exposure is a 1994 crime drama, starring Ron Perlman, Ian Buchanan, and Dedee Pfeiffer.

Plot
The Putnams, Roger ('Ian Buchanan') and Maria (Jennifer Gatti), continue an unstable marriage. She is unhappy at his obsessiveness and possessiveness, and he continually suspects her of having an affair. On Tuesday and Thursday nights, Maria is allowed out for a gym workout with their mutual friend and his colleague, Linda (Dedee Pfeiffer), but she gets home so late that he presumes she is up to something behind his back. He hires private detective John McClure (Ron Perlman) to find out if she is cheating and with whom. Meanwhile, Linda discovers that Roger has been skimming from the company they work for. McClure brings evidence to Roger that his wife is indeed having an affair. Roger wants Maria's lover killed and asks McClure to help him. McClure requests twenty-five thousand dollars and says that he knows a man who knows a man -but is really planning to do it himself because he's broke and is being blackmailed by an old friend. The plan is screwed up when McClure shoots blindly into the hotel room and shoots Maria instead of her lover. Enter a young homicide investigator (William R. Moses) and a forensic scientist who knows how to analyze a nanogram of dog excrement and human vomit to discover the actual identity of the killers and the lover.

Cast
Ron Perlman as John McClure
Ian Buchanan as Roger Putnam
Dedee Pfeiffer as Linda Mack
Jennifer Gatti as Maria Putnam
William R. Moses as Detective Joiner
James McEachin as Detective Becker
Bridget Hoffman as Ruby Marlowe

Production
As much as she loved the idea, actually filming a love scene with another woman with a full crew around was a challenge for Dedee Pfeiffer. "We both were really nervous in the sense that it's embarrassing," she said. "What I do with my personal life, whatever, but when it comes to being a professional in front of other people it becomes a whole different dynamic. When you're naked with another woman in front of a bunch of other people at 8 a.m., it's not the most sexy thing."

References

External links
 
 

1994 films
1994 crime drama films
American crime drama films
1990s English-language films
1990s American films